Victoria Barracks is a British Army barracks located  south of Windsor Castle.

History
The barracks were built in 1853 and were enlarged in 1911. The old barracks were completely demolished in 1988 and new barracks were built between 1989 and 1993. The barracks remain the place from where troops set off to change the guard at Windsor Castle. The sole garrisoned unit, the 1st Battalion, Coldstream Guards is a light infantry battalion operating since 2019 as part of the 11th Infantry Brigade and Headquarters South East.

References

Sources

Installations of the British Army
Windsor Castle
Barracks in England